Alexa Nicole Diaz (born 19 September 1993) is an American-born Filipino footballer who plays as a defender. She has been a member of the Philippines women's national team.

Early life
Diaz was born on 19 September 1993 to a Filipino father and a Panamanian mother in Seattle, U.S. She is a native of the town of Burien, Washington and attended John F. Kennedy Catholic High School.

Career
Diaz played for the Seattle Pacific Falcons women's soccer team during her college years as a defender.

Diaz was selected to be part of the Philippines women's national team that will later play in the 2014 AFC Women's Asian Cup qualifiers in Bangladesh in 2013 after participating in a tryout held in March 2012 by then-national team head coach Ernest Nierras in Corona, California. However she was not able to participate due to the late arrival of her proof of citizenship.

She later made her debut later that year, at the 2013 Southeast Asian Games playing in both group stage match against hosts, Myanmar and defending champions, Vietnam.

Diaz also took part in the Philippines' campaign in the 2018 AFC Women's Asian Cup in Jordan.

Coaching
She is part of the coaching staff of the Pacific Northwest Soccer Club and is a holder of at least a USSF National E License.

References

1993 births
Living people
Citizens of the Philippines through descent
Filipino women's footballers
Women's association football defenders
Philippines women's international footballers
Filipino people of Panamanian descent
Soccer players from Seattle
People from Burien, Washington
Sportspeople from King County, Washington
American women's soccer players
Seattle Pacific Falcons athletes
American sportspeople of Filipino descent
American sportspeople of Panamanian descent
21st-century American women